Danny Kay Goodwin (born September 2, 1953) is an American former professional baseball player. He played in Major League Baseball (MLB) as a first baseman and designated hitter from 1975 to 1982. Goodwin is the only baseball player to be drafted first overall in the Major League draft in two separate drafts.

1971 and 1975 draft first overall pick
Goodwin was initially drafted first overall by the Chicago White Sox in the 1971 Major League Baseball draft as a catcher straight out of Peoria Central High School. He chose, instead, to attend Southern University and A&M in Baton Rouge. He batted .394 with twenty home runs and 166 runs batted in for SUBR. In 1973, he played collegiate summer baseball with the Cotuit Kettleers of the Cape Cod Baseball League and was named a league all-star. He was a three-time All-America, at the NAIA level his sophomore and junior years, and at the NCAA level his senior year, and was named the Sporting News  College Player of the Year. Shortly afterwards, the California Angels selected him first overall pick in the 1975 Major League Baseball draft and signed him for a major league record $150,000.

California Angels
Eager to get their top prospect to the majors as quickly as possible, the Angels assigned Goodwin to the double-A El Paso Diablos in the Texas League upon his signing. Joining El Paso midway through the  season, Goodwin batted .275 with two home runs and 18 RBIs. He was called up to California in September and had just one hit (off the Kansas City Royals' Steve Busby) in ten at bats.

Goodwin split  between El Paso and the California League Salinas Angels. He batted over .300 for both clubs, while hitting eight home runs and driving in 69. On July 29, Goodwin hit his first career home run off Hall of Famer Fergie Jenkins. He would end the season with a .209 batting average, eight RBIs and one home run.

Goodwin returned to the El Paso Diablos for the  season where he excelled, producing an impressive .360 batting average along with 25 home runs and 89 RBIs in 101 games. He was called up to the major leagues that August, and seemed to finally display the promise that made him the first overall pick in two drafts. He batted .283 with two home runs and ten RBIs in August. After the season, he and first baseman Ron Jackson were traded to the Minnesota Twins for outfielder Dan Ford. Though Goodwin was a catcher in high school and college, he was only ever used as a designated hitter or pinch hitter by the Angels, and never saw any on the field action.

Minnesota Twins
Goodwin, who was never a very good fielding catcher, was converted into a first baseman by the Twins (though used primarily as a DH his first two seasons in Minnesota). His first season with the Twins stands as his best major league season. After once again starting the season in triple-A, Goodwin joined the Twins midway through the  season. In half a season, Goodwin batted .289 with five home runs and 27 RBIs, all career highs.

Appearing in just 55 games, he batted .200 with one home run and eleven RBIs. He was released after the season.

Oakland A's
Goodwin signed with the Oakland Athletics and spent the  season going back and forth between them and the triple-A Tacoma Tigers. While putting together an exceptional season for Tacoma (.301 avg., 11 home runs, 58 RBIs), Goodwin batted just .212 with two home runs and eight RBIs for the A's. He spent the next two seasons at Tacoma, where he batted .294 with 32 home runs and 147 RBIs, but never returned to the majors.

Career statistics

Once his playing days ended, Goodwin served as the Atlanta Braves' director of community relations, and later, as director of the Braves’ foundation, developing programs for underprivileged children in the city. In , Goodwin became the first player from a historically black university to be inducted into the National College Baseball Hall of Fame. While at SUBR, Goodwin also earned a degree in premed zoology.

Sources

External links
, or Pura Pelota (Venezuelan Winter League)

1953 births
Living people
African-American baseball players
American expatriate baseball players in Japan
Baseball players from St. Louis
California Angels players
National College Baseball Hall of Fame inductees
Cotuit Kettleers players
El Paso Diablos players
Major League Baseball designated hitters
Minnesota Twins players
Nankai Hawks players
Navegantes del Magallanes players
American expatriate baseball players in Venezuela
Oakland Athletics players
Ogden A's players
Salinas Angels players
Salt Lake City Gulls players
Southern Jaguars baseball players
Tacoma Tigers players
21st-century African-American people
20th-century African-American sportspeople